5400 or variation, may refer to:

In general
 A.D. 5400, a year in the 6th millennium CE
 5400 BC, a year in the 6th millennium BCE
 5400, a number in the 5000 (number) range

Electronics and computing
 Texas Instruments 5400 series ICs, a variant of the 7400-series integrated circuits
 Intel Pro 5400s SSD
 Intel 5400 chipset
 Power Macintosh 5400 personal computer

Other uses
 5400 (1989 CM), an asteroid in the Asteroid Belt, the 5400th asteroid registered; see List_of_minor_planets:_5001–6000
 5400 (District of Skrapar), one of the postal codes in Albania
 BS 5400 (British Standard 5400) in bridge construction
 GWR 5400 Class, pannier steam locomotive train class
 Red Flag 5400-class locomotive

See also